Robert Miklos is an American attorney and politician who served in the Texas House of Representatives, representing the 101st district from 2009 to 2011.

Early life and education 
Miklos was born on November 6, 1965 in Murray, Utah. He earned a Bachelor of Arts in History from the University of Texas at Austin and Juris Doctor from the University of Houston Law Center.

Career 
Prior to serving in the Texas House, Miklos worked as a prosecutor. He assumed office in 2009 and served for one term. He was defeated for re-election by Republican Cindy Burkett. In 2017, he was elected to the Mesquite City Council.

References 

Democratic Party members of the Texas House of Representatives
University of Texas at Austin alumni
University of Houston Law Center alumni
1965 births
Living people